Çadırkaya is a municipality (belde) in the Tercan District, Erzincan Province, Turkey. It had a population of 2,013 in 2021.

The neighborhoods of the municipality are Camii Kebir, Gözeler and Yeni.

See also 

 Bagayarich

References 

Populated places in Erzincan Province
Towns in Turkey